Leucopogon gelidus is a species of flowering plant in the heath family Ericaceae and is native to south-eastern continental Australia. It is a slender, compact shrub with elliptic to egg-shaped leaves, and spikes of drooping, tube-shaped white flowers.

Description 

Taxonomy
Leucopogon gelidus was first formally described in 1956 by Norman Arthur Wakefield in The Victorian Naturalist. The specific epithet (gelidus) means "very cold".

Distribution and habitat
This leucopogon grows in subalpine woodland on scree slopes and between rocks at higher altitudes south from Mount Gingera in New South Wales and the Australian Capital Territory to Lake Mountain in eastern Victoria.

References 

gelidus
Plants described in 1956
Taxa named by Norman Arthur Wakefield
Flora of New South Wales
Flora of the Australian Capital Territory
Flora of Victoria (Australia)